Large denominations of United States currency greater than  were circulated by the United States Treasury until 1969. Since then, U.S. dollar banknotes have been issued in seven denominations: $1, $2, $5, $10, $20, $50, and $100.

Overview and history
The first  note was issued by North Carolina, authorized by legislation dated May 10, 1780. High-denomination treasury notes were issued, for example during the War of 1812 ($1,000 notes authorized by an act dated June 30, 1812). During the American Civil War Confederate currency included  and  notes. In total, 11 different types of U.S. currency were issued in high-denomination notes across nearly 20 different series dates.
The obverse designs of United States banknotes generally depict either historical figures, allegorical figures symbolizing significant concepts (e.g., liberty, justice), or a combination of both. The reverse designs range from abstract scroll-work with ornate denomination identifiers to reproductions of historical art works.

Public versus institutional use
Series 1934 gold certificates ($100; ; ; and ) were issued after the gold standard was repealed and gold was compulsorily confiscated by order of President Franklin Roosevelt on March 9, 1933 (see United States Executive Order 6102). Thus the series 1934 notes were used only for intragovernmental (i.e., Federal Reserve Bank) transactions and were not issued to the public. This series was discontinued in 1940. The series 1928 gold certificate reverse was printed in black and green (see History of the United States dollar).

Passive retirement
Although they remain legal tender in the United States, high-denomination bills were last printed on December 27, 1945, and were officially discontinued on July 14, 1969, by the Federal Reserve System due to "lack of use". The lower production  and  notes had effectively disappeared well before then.

Beginning in July, 1969, the Federal Reserve began removing high-denomination currency from circulation and destroying any large bills returned by banks. , only 336  bills were known to exist, along with 342 remaining  bills and 165,372 remaining  bills. Due to their rarity, collectors pay considerably more than the face value of the bills to acquire them, and some are in museums in other parts of the world. 

These larger denomination bills were mainly used by banks and the federal government for large financial transactions, which was especially true for gold certificates from 1865 to 1934. However, the introduction of various electronic money systems has made large-scale cash transactions mostly unnecessary, and along with concerns about counterfeiting and the use of cash for unlawful activities (such as drug trafficking and money laundering), it is unlikely that the U.S. government will reissue any large-denomination currency in the foreseeable future. The purpose of the United States currency system is to serve the needs of the public and these denominations meet that goal. Neither the Department of the Treasury nor the Federal Reserve System has any plans to change the denominations in use today."

High-denomination banknote issuing data

Table of banknotes
The National Numismatic Collection at the Smithsonian Institution contains (among other things) the Bureau of Engraving and Printing (BEP) certified proofs and the Treasury Department collection of United States currency. Using a combination of proofs and issued notes, a nearly complete type set of high-denomination currency was compiled. Notably missing are several types of Compound and Interest Bearing Notes. Printed during the early to mid-1860s on very thin paper, these high-denomination notes are virtually non-existent. Their issuance (1861–65) predates the BEP's responsibility for U.S. currency (1870s), so it is fortunate that any proofs exist in the current archives.

See also

 Currency of the United States
 Gold certificate (United States)
 Promotional United States fake currency
 Silver certificate (United States)
 Silver standard
 Treasury Note (1890–91)

References

Explanatory footnotes

Citations

General bibliography

External links

 Large Denominations from the Bureau of Engraving and Printing
 U.S. Department of the Treasury

Paper money of the United States